Jõhvi Airfield (ICAO: EEJI) is an airfield in Jõhvi, Ida-Viru County, Estonia.

The airfield's owner is Foundation Jõhvi Lennuväli.

References

Airports in Estonia
Buildings and structures in Ida-Viru County
Jõhvi